Emleys Hill (also Emley's Hill) is an unincorporated community located within Upper Freehold Township in Monmouth County, New Jersey, United States. The settlement is located at the intersection of Emleys Hill Road and Burlington Path Road.

Emley's Hill United Methodist Church, founded in 1790, is located there. Except for the church and adjacent cemetery, the area consists of farmland over rolling hills.

References

Upper Freehold Township, New Jersey
Unincorporated communities in Monmouth County, New Jersey
Unincorporated communities in New Jersey